Poggenburg may refer to:

André Poggenburg
Justus Ferdinand Poggenburg (disambiguation)
German name of Żabikowo, Luboń